In numerical analysis, one of the most important problems is designing efficient and stable algorithms for finding the eigenvalues of a matrix.  These eigenvalue algorithms may also find eigenvectors.

Eigenvalues and eigenvectors

Given an  square matrix  of real or complex numbers, an eigenvalue  and its associated generalized eigenvector  are a pair obeying the relation

When , the vector is called simply an eigenvector, and the pair is called an eigenpair. In this case, . Any eigenvalue  of  has ordinary eigenvectors associated to it, for if  is the smallest integer such that  for a generalized eigenvector , then  is an ordinary eigenvector.

The latter terminology is justified by the equation

So the algebraic multiplicity is the multiplicity of the eigenvalue as a zero of the characteristic polynomial. Since any eigenvector is also a generalized eigenvector, the geometric multiplicity is less than or equal to the algebraic multiplicity. By the Cayley–Hamilton theorem,  itself obeys the same equation: .

Any collection of generalized eigenvectors of distinct eigenvalues is linearly independent, so a basis for all of  can be chosen consisting of generalized eigenvectors. More particularly, this basis  can be chosen and organized so that
 if  is not an ordinary eigenvector, and if  is its eigenvalue, then  (in particular,  must be an ordinary eigenvector).
If these basis vectors are placed as the column vectors of a matrix , then  can be used to convert  to its Jordan normal form:

That is, similar matrices have the same eigenvalues.

Normal, Hermitian, and real-symmetric matrices

The adjoint  of a complex matrix  is the transpose of the conjugate of : . A square matrix  is called normal if it commutes with its adjoint: . It is called Hermitian if it is equal to its adjoint: . All Hermitian matrices are normal. When applied to column vectors, the adjoint can be used to define the canonical inner product on : . Normal, Hermitian, and real-symmetric matrices have several useful properties:
 Every generalized eigenvector of a normal matrix is an ordinary eigenvector.
 Any normal matrix is similar to a diagonal matrix, since its Jordan normal form is diagonal.
 Eigenvectors of distinct eigenvalues of a normal matrix are orthogonal. 
 The null space and the image (or column space) of a normal matrix are orthogonal to each other. 
The corresponding matrix of eigenvectors is unitary.
 The eigenvalues of a Hermitian matrix are real, since  for a non-zero eigenvector .
 If  is real, there is an orthonormal basis for  consisting of eigenvectors of  if and only if  is symmetric.

It is possible for a real or complex matrix to have all real eigenvalues without being Hermitian. For example, a real triangular matrix has its eigenvalues along its diagonal, but in general is not symmetric.

Condition number

Any problem of numeric calculation can be viewed as the evaluation of some function  for some input . The condition number  of the problem is the ratio of the relative error in the function's output to the relative error in the input, and varies with both the function and the input. The condition number describes how error grows during the calculation. Its base-10 logarithm tells how many fewer digits of accuracy exist in the result than existed in the input. The condition number is a best-case scenario. It reflects the instability built into the problem, regardless of how it is solved. No algorithm can ever produce more accurate results than indicated by the condition number, except by chance. However, a poorly designed algorithm may produce significantly worse results. For example, as mentioned below, the problem of finding eigenvalues for normal matrices is always well-conditioned. However, the problem of finding the roots of a polynomial can be very ill-conditioned. Thus eigenvalue algorithms that work by finding the roots of the characteristic polynomial can be ill-conditioned even when the problem is not.

If  is unitary, then , so . For general matrices, the operator norm is often difficult to calculate. For this reason, other matrix norms are commonly used to estimate the condition number.

Thus the eigenvalue problem for all normal matrices is well-conditioned.

In particular, the eigenspace problem for normal matrices is well-conditioned for isolated eigenvalues. When eigenvalues are not isolated, the best that can be hoped for is to identify the span of all eigenvectors of nearby eigenvalues.

Algorithms

The most reliable and most widely used algorithm for computing eigenvalues is John G. F. Francis' QR algorithm, considered one of the top ten algorithms of 20th century.

Any monic polynomial is the characteristic polynomial of its companion matrix. Therefore, a general algorithm for finding eigenvalues could also be used to find the roots of polynomials. The Abel–Ruffini theorem shows that any such algorithm for dimensions greater than 4 must either be infinite, or involve functions of greater complexity than elementary arithmetic operations and fractional powers. For this reason algorithms that exactly calculate eigenvalues in a finite number of steps only exist for a few special classes of matrices. For general matrices, algorithms are iterative, producing better approximate solutions with each iteration.

Some algorithms produce every eigenvalue, others will produce a few, or only one. However, even the latter algorithms can be used to find all eigenvalues. Once an eigenvalue  of a matrix  has been identified, it can be used to either direct the algorithm towards a different solution next time, or to reduce the problem to one that no longer has  as a solution.

For example, for power iteration, . Power iteration finds the largest eigenvalue in absolute value, so even when  is only an approximate eigenvalue, power iteration is unlikely to find it a second time.

Reduction can be accomplished by restricting  to the column space of the matrix , which  carries to itself. Since  is singular, the column space is of lesser dimension. The eigenvalue algorithm can then be applied to the restricted matrix. This process can be repeated until all eigenvalues are found.

If an eigenvalue algorithm does not produce eigenvectors, a common practice is to use an inverse iteration based algorithm with  set to a close approximation to the eigenvalue.

A formula for the norm of unit eigenvector components of normal matrices was discovered by Robert Thompson in 1966 and rediscovered independently by several others. 
Then

Hessenberg and tridiagonal matrices

Because the eigenvalues of a triangular matrix are its diagonal elements, for general matrices there is no finite method like gaussian elimination to convert a matrix to triangular form while preserving eigenvalues. But it is possible to reach something close to triangular. An upper Hessenberg matrix is a square matrix for which all entries below the subdiagonal are zero. A lower Hessenberg matrix is one for which all entries above the superdiagonal are zero. Matrices that are both upper and lower Hessenberg are tridiagonal. Hessenberg and tridiagonal matrices are the starting points for many eigenvalue algorithms because the zero entries reduce the complexity of the problem. Several methods are commonly used to convert a general matrix into a Hessenberg matrix with the same eigenvalues. If the original matrix was symmetric or Hermitian, then the resulting matrix will be tridiagonal.

When only eigenvalues are needed, there is no need to calculate the similarity matrix, as the transformed matrix has the same eigenvalues. If eigenvectors are needed as well, the similarity matrix may be needed to transform the eigenvectors of the Hessenberg matrix back into eigenvectors of the original matrix.

For symmetric tridiagonal eigenvalue problems all eigenvalues (without eigenvectors) can be computed numerically in time O(n log(n)), using bisection on the characteristic polynomial.

Iterative algorithms
Iterative algorithms solve the eigenvalue problem by producing sequences that converge to the eigenvalues. Some algorithms also produce sequences of vectors that converge to the eigenvectors. Most commonly, the eigenvalue sequences are expressed as sequences of similar matrices which converge to a triangular or diagonal form, allowing the eigenvalues to be read easily. The eigenvector sequences are expressed as the corresponding similarity matrices.

Direct calculation

While there is no simple algorithm to directly calculate eigenvalues for general matrices, there are numerous special classes of matrices where eigenvalues can be directly calculated. These include:

Triangular matrices

Since the determinant of a triangular matrix is the product of its diagonal entries, if T is triangular, then . Thus the eigenvalues of T are its diagonal entries.

Factorable polynomial equations

If  is any polynomial and  then the eigenvalues of  also satisfy the same equation. If  happens to have a known factorization, then the eigenvalues of  lie among its roots.

For example, a projection is a square matrix  satisfying . The roots of the corresponding scalar polynomial equation, are 0 and 1. Thus any projection has 0 and 1 for its eigenvalues.

Another example is a matrix  that satisfies  for some scalar . The eigenvalues must be . The projection operators

satisfy

and

2×2 matrices

For dimensions 2 through 4, formulas involving radicals exist that can be used to find the eigenvalues. While a common practice for 2×2 and 3×3 matrices, for 4×4 matrices the increasing complexity of the root formulas makes this approach less attractive.

For the 2×2 matrix

the characteristic polynomial is

Thus the eigenvalues can be found by using the quadratic formula:

Defining   to be the distance between the two eigenvalues, it is straightforward to calculate

From this it follows that the calculation is well-conditioned if the eigenvalues are isolated.

Eigenvectors can be found by exploiting the Cayley–Hamilton theorem. Assuming neither matrix is zero, the columns of each must include eigenvectors for the other eigenvalue. (If either matrix is zero, then  is a multiple of the identity and any non-zero vector is an eigenvector.)

For example, suppose

and the eigenvalues are 3 and -2. Now,

In both matrices, the columns are multiples of each other, so either column can be used.

3×3 matrices

The characteristic equation of a symmetric 3×3 matrix  is:

This equation may be solved using the methods of Cardano or Lagrange, but an affine change to  will simplify the expression considerably, and lead directly to a trigonometric solution.

Thus

This issue doesn't arise when  is real and symmetric, resulting in a simple algorithm:

% Given a real symmetric 3x3 matrix A, compute the eigenvalues
% Note that acos and cos operate on angles in radians

p1 = A(1,2)^2 + A(1,3)^2 + A(2,3)^2
if (p1 == 0) 
   % A is diagonal.
   eig1 = A(1,1)
   eig2 = A(2,2)
   eig3 = A(3,3)
else
   q = trace(A)/3               % trace(A) is the sum of all diagonal values
   p2 = (A(1,1) - q)^2 + (A(2,2) - q)^2 + (A(3,3) - q)^2 + 2 * p1
   p = sqrt(p2 / 6)
   B = (1 / p) * (A - q * I)    % I is the identity matrix
   r = det(B) / 2

   % In exact arithmetic for a symmetric matrix  -1 <= r <= 1
   % but computation error can leave it slightly outside this range.
   if (r <= -1) 
      phi = pi / 3
   elseif (r >= 1)
      phi = 0
   else
      phi = acos(r) / 3
   end

   % the eigenvalues satisfy eig3 <= eig2 <= eig1
   eig1 = q + 2 * p * cos(phi)
   eig3 = q + 2 * p * cos(phi + (2*pi/3))
   eig2 = 3 * q - eig1 - eig3     % since trace(A) = eig1 + eig2 + eig3
end

Once again, the eigenvectors of  can be obtained by recourse to the Cayley–Hamilton theorem. Thus the columns of the product of any two of these matrices will contain an eigenvector for the third eigenvalue.

For example, let

The characteristic equation is

with eigenvalues 1 (of multiplicity 2) and -1. Calculating,

and

Once found, the eigenvectors can be normalized if needed.

Eigenvectors of normal 3×3 matrices 
If a 3×3 matrix  is normal, then the cross-product can be used to find eigenvectors. The cross product of two independent columns of   will be in the null space. Since the column space is two dimensional in this case, the eigenspace must be one dimensional, so any other eigenvector will be parallel to it.

If  does not contain two independent columns but is not , the cross-product can still be used. In this case  is an eigenvalue of multiplicity 2, so any vector perpendicular to the column space will be an eigenvector.

This does not work when  is not normal, as the null space and column space do not need to be perpendicular for such matrices.

See also
 List of eigenvalue algorithms

Notes

References

Further reading

Numerical linear algebra